Thames Ditton railway station serves Thames Ditton in the Elmbridge district of Surrey, England.

It is served by South Western Railway, and for the purposes of fare charging is in Travelcard Zone 6.

Station buildings are above street level: the main buildings are on the London-bound side.

Services

The typical off-peak service from the station is:

2 trains per hour to London Waterloo via Surbiton and Wimbledon
2 trains per hour to Hampton Court

The first direct weekday services to London Waterloo start at 5:56 and the last direct service leaves at 23:30. The Saturday service is identical to the weekday service, and the Sunday service has an identical frequency but starts later and finishes earlier. The journey time to and from Waterloo is 33 minutes for the 14-mile (22 km) distance.

Facilities

As Thames Ditton is an intermediate station, facilities at the station are relatively limited. There is a single-window ticket office within the station building, as well as a lone ticket machine on the 'up' platform. A small coffee kiosk service had been suspended, but resumed service in 2012, however it is only open during the morning peak times.

There is no station car park, and only a handful of static cycle racks are available. Station toilets are not advertised.

Bus services 513, 514, 515 and on Sundays 715 serve the station.

Future

As part of the proposed Crossrail 2 infrastructure, Hampton Court has been proposed by business group London First as the terminus for a potential service to Cheshunt via Central London, opening in the "early 2030s". It has been suggested that Crossrail 2 will serve Thames Ditton exclusively following this, with an increase from two trains per hour to four.

References

External links 

Railway stations in Surrey
Former London and South Western Railway stations
Railway stations in Great Britain opened in 1851
Railway stations served by South Western Railway
1849 establishments in England
Borough of Elmbridge